Lebedovo (also Dolinniye) was an air base in Russia located 18 km southeast of Privolzsky.  It appeared on Department of Defense aeronautical charts dating from the 1960s and 1970s.  It was probably a local diversion site for Engels bombers.  It is now a dairy farm and the runways have been scrapped.

References
RussianAirFields.com
MAP 

Soviet Air Force bases
Soviet Long Range Aviation